Ruben Felix (born June 24, 1970 in El Paso, Texas) was the bullpen catcher and batting practice pitcher for MLB's Baltimore Orioles from 2008 to 2009.

Career
Prior to joining the Orioles, Felix was with the Cleveland Indians organization as an assistant on the Major League coaching staff. He took that position in February 2004. Previously, he was the head baseball coach at Galveston College for three seasons, from 2001–04, before joining Eric Wedge's staff. He also worked as an assistant coach for the Texas Tech Red Raiders baseball and softball teams. While working at Texas Tech, he earned a degree in general studies.

Head coaching record

Personal
Felix's wife's name is Michelle. They reside in Oxford, Mississippi.

References

External links

1970 births
Living people
Texas Tech Red Raiders baseball coaches
Cleveland Indians coaches
Ole Miss Rebels softball coaches
Major League Baseball bullpen catchers